Ganzhou railway station is a railway station located in Zhanggong District, Ganzhou, Jiangxi, China. It is one of two passenger railway stations in Ganzhou, the other being Ganzhou West railway station which is served by high-speed trains. It has five platforms and an avoiding line in each direction.

History
The railway station was opened in 1996 with the Beijing–Kowloon railway. An additional island platform was put into use in January 2013.

References

Railway stations in Jiangxi
Railway stations in China opened in 1996
Stations on the Beijing–Kowloon Railway